Limnogonus is a genus of water striders in the family Gerridae. There are 28 described species in Limnogonus. Similar to other gerromorphan bugs, most species of Limnogonus have both macropterous specimens, which means that they are often able to fly. The wings are thought to be an adaptation to help the insects get away from drought allowing them to fly to the next available area that has water bodies when the rainy season arrives

Species
These 28 species belong to the genus Limnogonus and its two subgenera:
Subgenus Limnogonoides:
 Limnogonus capensis (China, 1925)
 Limnogonus curriei Bergroth, 1916
 Limnogonus guttatus Poisson, 1948
 Limnogonus hypoleucus (Gerstaecker, 1873)
 Limnogonus intermedius Poisson, 1941
 Limnogonus nigrescens Poisson, 1941
 Limnogonus pectoralis (Mayr, 1865)
 Limnogonus poissoni Andersen, 1975

Subgenus Limnogonus:
 Limnogonus aduncus Drake & Harris, 1933-01
 Limnogonus anderseni Zettel, 2004-01
 Limnogonus buxtoni Esaki, 1928
 Limnogonus carinatus Rendón, Mondragón-F., & Morales, 2018
 Limnogonus cereiventris (Signoret, 1862)
 Limnogonus cheesmani Lundblad, 1934
 Limnogonus darthulus (Kirkaldy, 1901)
 Limnogonus fossarum (Fabricius, 1775)
 Limnogonus franciscanus (Stål, 1859)
 Limnogonus hungerfordi Andersen, 1975
 Limnogonus hyalinus (Fabricius, 1803)
 Limnogonus ignotus Drake & Harris, 1934
 Limnogonus luctuosus (Montrouzier, 1865)
 Limnogonus lundbladi Usinger, 1946
 Limnogonus nitidus (Mayr, 1865)
 Limnogonus papuensis Andersen, 1975
 Limnogonus profugus Drake & Harris, 1930-30
 Limnogonus recens Drake & Harris, 1934
 Limnogonus recurvus Drake & Harris, 1930-30
 Limnogonus windi Hungerford & Matsuda, 1961

References

Further reading

 

Articles created by Qbugbot
Gerrini
Gerromorpha genera